The Sri Lankan cricket team toured Netherlands from 4 to 6 July 2006. The tour was for two One Day Internationals (ODIs) between Sri Lanka and Netherlands.

Squads

Matches

1st ODI

The first match of this series recorded the highest innings totals ever.

2nd ODI

References

2006 in cricket
2006 in Dutch cricket
International cricket competitions in 2006